Cotton wool consists of silky fibers taken from cotton plants in their raw state. Impurities, such as seeds, are removed and the cotton is then bleached using hydrogen peroxide or sodium hypochlorite and sterilized. It is also a refined product (absorbent cotton in U.S. usage) which has medical, cosmetic and many other practical uses.

The first medical use of cotton wool was by Dr Joseph Sampson Gamgee at the Queen's Hospital (later the General Hospital) in Birmingham, England. Although cotton wool is called cotton wool it is actually not wool at all. It is from the cotton plant. Most cotton comes from India, The United States or, China. Cotton plants prefer heavy soil to grow well. Good locations, such as seasonally dry tropical areas, or subtropics are perfect.

References
 Absorbent and medicated surgical dressings, J. S. Gamgee, in The Lancet, London, 24 January 1880

Cotton